The Jay-Z Fall Tour 2009 was a concert tour by American rapper Jay-Z in support of his eleventh studio album The Blueprint 3. The routing took the rap mogul to 18 cities 
in the U.S. and 7 in Canada, kicking off with a 9/11 benefit concert on September 9 in New York City and ending in Austin, Texas on November 22. It was announced in November 2009 that dates would be added for 2010, with Trey Songz and Young Jeezy joining Jay-Z as opening acts. The Jay-Z Fall Tour and its 2010 leg have also been referred to as The Blueprint 3 Tour.

Opening acts
 J. Cole
 Wale
 N.E.R.D.
 Trey Songz (2010 Leg)
 Young Jeezy (2010 Leg)

Personnel
The Roc Boys

Omar Edwards - musical director, keyboards 

Monty - keyboards

Tony Russell - bass

Shaun Carrington - guitar

Natural - guitar (select dates only)

Tony Royster Jr. - drums (solo on "Show Me What You Got")

Brett Baker - percussion

DJ GURU - DJ 

DJ NEIL ARMSTRONG - DJ (select dates only)

Lamont Caldwell - saxophone

Lee Hogans - trumpet

Aaron Goode - trombone

Set list
"Run This Town"
"D.O.A. (Death of Autotune)"
"U Don't Know"
"Show Me What You Got"
"I Just Wanna Love U (Give It 2 Me)"
"Jigga What, Jigga Who"
"Izzo (H.O.V.A.)"
"P.S.A. (Public Service Announcement)"
"Heart of The City (Ain't No Love)"
"Already Home" (w/ Trey Songz)
"Empire State of Mind" (w/ Bridget Kelly)
"So Ambitious" (w/ Pharrell)
"Dirt off Your Shoulder"
"A Star is Born" (w/ J. Cole)
"Thank You"
"On to the Next One"
"Venus vs. Mars"
"Swagga Like Us"
"Can I Get A..."
"Big Pimpin'"
"Hard Knock Life (Ghetto Anthem)"
"Encore"
"Young Forever"

Tour dates

Cancelled dates

The following dates have been canceled by tour promoter Live Nation, due to "an unforeseen scheduling conflict."

November 17, Lubbock
November 19, Albuquerque
November 20, El Paso

References

2009 concert tours
Jay-Z concert tours